"The Foundation of S.F. Success" is a 1954 pastiche by American writer Isaac Asimov, of the patter song "If you're anxious for to shine" from the Gilbert and Sullivan comic opera Patience, describing the easy way to become a successful writer.  Asimov borrows Gilbert's rhythm and rhyme schemes in the song. It includes the lines: With a tiny bit of cribbin' from the works of Edward Gibbon and that Greek, Thucydides, in which Asimov is lampooning himself, referring to the inspiration for the Foundation stories. It was the first poem that Asimov ever sold.

The piece was first published in The Magazine of Fantasy and Science Fiction in October 1954.  It was later included in Asimov's short story collection Earth is Room Enough (1957) and his The Complete Stories, vol. 1 (1990).

See also
"The Author's Ordeal"

References

External links

Works by Isaac Asimov
Adaptations of works by Gilbert and Sullivan
Works originally published in The Magazine of Fantasy & Science Fiction
1954 songs